Fernando Ezequiel Oscaris (born December 11, 1979 in Buenos Aires) is a field hockey defender from Argentina, who was a member of the national squad that competed in the 2000 Summer Olympics in Sydney, Australia. He was on the side that won the golden medal at the 2003 Pan American Games in Santo Domingo.

References

External links

1979 births
Living people
Argentine male field hockey players
Male field hockey defenders
Olympic field hockey players of Argentina
Field hockey players at the 2000 Summer Olympics
2002 Men's Hockey World Cup players
2006 Men's Hockey World Cup players
Field hockey players from Buenos Aires
Pan American Games gold medalists for Argentina
Pan American Games medalists in field hockey
Field hockey players at the 2003 Pan American Games
Medalists at the 2003 Pan American Games
21st-century Argentine people